The women's individual compound competition at the 2011 World Archery Championships took place on 5–10 July 2011 in Torino, Italy. As there were fewer than 104 competitors, the 4 July qualification round determined the rankings for the 83 entrants; all archers qualified for the knockout tournament on 7–8 July, with the semi-finals and finals on 9 July.

Second seed Albina Loginova became the first woman to defend the title, defeating Pascale Lebecque in the final.

Seeds
The top eight scorers in the qualifying round were seeded, and received byes to the third round. As there were fewer than 104 entrants, seeds 9-29 also received byes to the second round.

Draw

Top half

Section 1

Section 2

Section 3

Section 4

Bottom half

Section 5

Section 6

Section 7

Section 8

Finals

References

2011 World Archery Championships
World